Masoud Zaribafan is an Iranian conservative politician. He was formerly a Tehran councilor, vice president and cabinet secretary during Presidency of Mahmoud Ahmadinejad.

References 

1957 births
Living people
Alliance of Builders of Islamic Iran politicians
Coalition of the Pleasant Scent of Servitude politicians
Society of Devotees of the Islamic Revolution politicians
Tehran Councillors 2003–2007
Heads of Foundation of Martyrs and Veterans Affairs
YEKTA Front politicians
Iranian campaign managers